
This is a list of aircraft in numerical order of manufacturer followed by alphabetical order beginning with 'My'.

My

Myasishchev 
 Myasishchev DVB-102
 Myasishchev DB-108
 Myasishchev VB-109
 Myasishchev DIS
 Myasishchev SDB
 Myasishchev DVB-202
 Myasishchev DVB-302
 Myasishchev DSB-17
 Myasishchev Project 25
 Myasishchev Product 103
 Myasishchev M
 Myasishchev 2M
 Myasishchev 3M
 Myasishchev M-4
 Myasishchev Subject 34
 Myasishchev M-17 'Stratosphera'
 Myasishchev M-18
 Myasishchev M-28
 Myasishchev M-50
 Myasishchev M-52
 Myasishchev M-55 'Geofizika'
 Myasishchev VM-T
 Myasishchev VM-T Atlant
 Myasishchev M-101T
 Myasishchev M-102
 Myasishchev M-103 Skif

Myers 
(Myers Flying Service, Paterson, NJ)
 Myers Annular
 Myers Helicopter
 Myers Helicopter 2

Myers 
(Lloyd W Myers, St Petersburg, FL)
 Myers 2

Myers 
(Howard H "Pete" Myers, Lawn, IL)
 Myers M-1
 Myers M-2

Mylius 
(Mylius Flugzeugwerk GmbH & Co KG – Albert Mylius)
 Mylius My-102 Tornado
 Mylius My-103 Mistral
 Mylius My-103/180
 Mylius My-103/200
 Mylius My-104

MySky Aircraft 
(Port Orange, FL)
MySky MS One

References

Further reading

External links 

 List of Aircraft (M)

fr:Liste des aéronefs (I-M)